Kunin        is a Lebanese municipality located in Bint Jbeil District, south-east of Tebnine.

Name
E. H. Palmer wrote that the name Kunin came from a personal name.

History
In 1875, Victor Guérin gives the population of this place at 400, divided between Moslems and Metawileh.

In 1881, the PEF's Survey of Western Palestine (SWP)  described it as: "A village, built of stone, containing about 200
They further noted: "There are two round and two octagonal pillars at this village, remains of old materials, and a lintel measuring 17' long and bearing a Greek inscription. There are also several cisterns and a large birkeh. The inscription on the lintel is probably the common formula, KYPIE BOHΘH ("Help, Lord")."

References

Bibliography

External links 
 Kounine, Localiban
Survey of Western Palestine, Map 4: IAA, Wikimedia commons 

Populated places in Bint Jbeil District
Shia Muslim communities in Lebanon